The Consumer Federation of America (CFA) is a non-profit organization founded in 1968 to advance consumer interests through research, education and advocacy.

According to CFA's website, its members are nearly 300 consumer-oriented non-profits, which themselves have a combined membership of 50 million people. CFA members include national organizations such as Consumers Union and U.S. PIRG, state and local consumer organizations, state and local protection agencies, credit unions, rural electric cooperatives and public power groups. Members pay dues ranging from under $100 to $20,000 per year, elect the board of directors and vote on policies.

CFA has a wide range of activities and interests, many centered on scrutiny of businesses and their practices, products, and services by citizens, civic groups, the news media, and government regulatory agencies as a method of defending the interests of the public at large.  It is generally regarded as liberal in the modern American sense of the term, and is associated with the consumer movement. CFA is headquartered in Washington, DC, with numerous state and local members. CFA is a 501(c)(3) organization.

State consumer federations such as Consumer Federation of California, Alabama Arise, Chicago Consumer Coalition, Wisconsin Consumers League, and the North Carolina Consumers Council also exist, advocating for similar rules and regulations but with a narrower geographic focus.  All CFA member groups retain their autonomy. At the same time, their bylaws reflect a tendency to be united in purpose in order to more significantly impact public policy.

Origins and Leadership 

CFA emerged from a national consumer forum, called Consumer Assembly that was first held in April 1966 to advance new consumer protections. Encouraged by White House Consumer Adviser Esther Peterson, representatives from nearly 60 consumer groups, consumer cooperative groups, and industrial trade unions decided to form a permanent organization that was formally launched in April 1968.

CFA made Consumer Assembly its annual conference and held this forum in conjunction with the organization’s annual meeting. At this meeting, member organizations elected a 40 to 43-person board of directors and debated and voted on policy resolutions for the organization.

The CFA Board selected Erma Angevine as the organization’s first Executive Director. She served until 1973, then was followed by Carol Tucker Foreman (1973-1977), Kathleen O’Reilly (1977-1980), Stephen Brobeck (1980-2018), Jack Gillis (2018-2022).  Currently, Susan Weinstock is the CEO of CFA (2022–present). Retired Senator Howard Metzenbaum served as Honorary Chairman from 1995 to 2008.

Funding 

Historically, CFA’s base of support has been member dues' payments, contributions, and grants. For decades, Consumers Union has contributed, through contributions and grants, more than $100,000 a year.

Over the past decade, the largest source of support has been grants by national foundations including Ford, Annie E. Casey, Rockefeller, Atlantic Philanthropies, and Heron. Other revenue is derived from cy-près awards, Consumer Assembly, the annual Awards dinner, and financial services and food policy issue conferences, to which some corporate groups contribute. America Saves (see below), which CFA organized and manages, was supported initially by the Ford Foundation, but now mainly is supported by corporate foundations.

Advocacy
Advocacy is one of the important tools that CFA uses to advance the consumer interest. 
“CFA works to advance pro-consumer policies on a variety of issues before Congress, the White House, federal and state regulatory agencies, state legislatures, and the courts. We communicate and work with public officials to promote beneficial policies, oppose harmful ones, and ensure a balanced debate on issues important to consumers.” 
CFA advocates on numerous issues that are important to the consumer community. In recent years, these issues have included:
Advocating for a Consumer Financial Protection Agency.
Advocating for consumer protections for credit cards, including passage of the Credit Card Accountability, Responsibility, and Disclosure (CARD) Act.
Advocating for the implementation of higher fuel efficiency (CAFE) standards.
Advocating for consumer protections for investors, including passage of the Sarbanes Oxley law.
Advocating for more authority and responsibility for the Food and Drug Administration to ensure the safety of the food supply.
Advocating for product safety laws, including passage of the Consumer Product Safety Improvement Act and ATV regulation.

America Saves 

America Saves is a nationwide campaign of the Consumer Federation of America (CFA) that assists and encourages individuals to save money, reduce spending, and "build wealth."  The campaign is a social marketing effort that seeks to stimulate behavior change, similar to other social marketing efforts to reduce smoking, curtail drunk driving, and promote wearing seat belts.

Launched in Cleveland in 2001, America Saves campaigns have expanded to over 65 communities, enrolled almost 400,000 savers, and involved over 2,500 organizations in supporting local, regional and statewide campaigns.  Banks and credit unions are offering low minimum balance, no-fee savings accounts.  In order to enroll as a Saver, individuals commit to a savings plan that identifies a savings goal.

Examples of local campaigns include (among others) Cleveland Saves, Philadelphia Saves, and Milwaukee Saves. Regional campaigns include Silicon Valley/South Bay Saves, Northwoods Saves, and Okaloosa County Saves. And, statewide campaigns have been organized in Tennessee, Georgia, Kansas, North Carolina, Louisiana, Arizona (based in Phoenix), and Delaware.
In addition to individual campaigns, America Saves plans and implements initiatives related to particular populations—youth, faith-based organizations, military personnel, African Americans, Hispanic Americans; and, to specific savings strategies—homeownership, tax refunds, at work saving, and car purchases.

With the American Savings Education Council, America Saves organizes an annual "America Saves Week" where they encourage new individuals to join the campaign and existing members to assess their goals. During Saves Weeks, America Saves comes together with its partners (Federal Reserve Board, Cooperative Extension, Department of Defense, etc.) as well as its locally run campaigns. These organizations work during the week to assist individuals to manage their existing funds, participate in informational workshops, and to create savings accounts.

State & Local Consumer Member Groups 

 Alaska Public Interest Research Group
 American Council on Consumer Awareness
 Arizona Consumers Council
 Arizona Public Interest Research Group
 Democratic Processes Center
 Arizona Consumers Council Foundation
 California Alliance for Consumer Education
 California Consumer Affairs Association
 California Public Interest Research Group
 California Reinvestment Coalition
 Center for California Homeowner Association Law
 Center for Public Interest Law
 Consumer Action
 Consumer Federation of California
 Consumers for Auto Reliability and Safety
 Privacy Rights Clearinghouse, California
 Utility Consumers Action Network
 United Policyholders
 New Mexico Public Interest Research Group
 Center for Economic Justice
 Texas Consumer Association
 Exodus Lending
 Texas Legal Services Center
 Texas Low Income Housing Information Service
 Texas Watch
 Alabama Arise
 The Alabama Appleseed Center for Law and Justice
 Arkansas Public Policy Panel
 Consumer Federation of the Southeast
 Florida Consumer Action Network
 Florida Department of Agriculture and Consumer Services
 Florida Funeral & Cemetery Consumer Advocacy
 Florida Public Interest Research Group
 Havana Community Technology & Learning Center, Inc.
 United Way of the Big Bend, Inc.
 Georgia Public Interest Research Group
 The Kentucky Equal Justice Center
 Kids in Danger [Fighting for Product Safety]
 National Association of Unclaimed Property Administrators
 Fund Democracy, Inc.
 Community Reinvestment Association of North Carolina
 The Funeral Consumers Alliance of the Triangle
 North Carolina Consumers Council
 North Carolina Public Interest Research Group
 Columbia Consumer Education Council
 Tennessee Citizen Action
 UDC CES CREB
 Maryland Consumer Rights Coalition
 Maryland Public Interest Research Group
 Consumers League of New Jersey
 New Jersey Citizen Action
 New Jersey Public Interest Research Group
 Bay Ridge Consumer Federation
 Center for Justice and Democracy
 Empire Justice Center
 Empire State Consumer Project
 Harlem Consumer Education Council
 Neighborhood Economic Development Advocacy Project
 New York Public Interest Research Group
 Public Utility Law Project of New York
 Community Action Partnership of Mercer County
 Pennsylvania Public Interest Research Group
 Virginia Citizens Consumer Council
 Virginia Poverty Law Center
 Mountain State Justice
 Connecticut Public Interest Research Group
 Consumer Assistance Council
 Consumer Assistance Office Metro West, Inc.
 Greater Lawrence Community Action Council, Inc.
 Massachusetts Affordable Housing Alliance
 Massachusetts Consumers' Coalition
 Massachusetts Consumers Council
 Massachusetts Public Interest Research Group
 National Consumer Law Center
 South Shore Community Action Council' Consumer Aid Program
 Rhode Island Public Interest Research Group
 Funeral Consumers Alliance
 Vermont Public Interest Research Group
 Iowa Public Interest Research Group
 Center for Economic Progress, Chicago
 Chicago Consumer Coalition
 Illinois Public Interest Research Group
 Sargent Shriver National Center on Poverty Law
 Woodstock Institute
 Public Interest Research Group in Michigan
 Minnesota Public Interest Research Group
 Consumers United
 Consumers Council of Missouri
 Consumer Protection Association
 Ohio Public Interest Research Group
 Citizens Utility Board
 Economic Justice Institute- Wisconsin
 Wisconsin Consumers League
 Wisconsin Student Public Interest Research Group
 Colorado Public Interest Research Group
 Consumer League for Education and Reform
 Consumers United Association
 Consumers United
 Citizens' Utility Board of Oregon
 Oregon Consumers League
 OSPIRG Foundation
 Washington Community Action Network
 Washington Public Interest Research Group

References

External links
 Official Consumer Federation of America website
 Consumer Federation of California Website
 Consumer Federation of America Official Facebook Page
 Washington Community Action Network Website
 National Consumer Law Center Website
 Massachusetts Public Interest Research Group Website
 North Carolina Consumers Council Website

Political advocacy groups in the United States
Consumer organizations in the United States
Government watchdog groups in the United States
Charities based in Washington, D.C.